Rachel Hawkins  is the author of Hex Hall, a best-selling trilogy of young adult paranormal romance novels. She is from Dothan, Alabama. She also writes as Erin Sterling.

Biography
Hawkins was born in Newport News, Virginia, moved to Dothan, Alabama at a young age, graduated from Houston Academy in 1998, and received a degree in English literature from Auburn University in 2002. She began writing her first novel, Hex Hall, while working as an English teacher at Sparkman High School. As of 2021, Hawkins lives with her family in Auburn, Alabama.

Bibliography

Hex Hall
 Hex Hall (2010) 
 Demonglass (2011) 
 Spell Bound (2012)
 School Spirits (2013)
 Short story: "A Very Hexy Valentine's Day" (2013)

Rebel Belle trilogy
 Rebel Belle (2014) 
 Miss Mayhem (2015)
 Lady Renegades (2016)

Royals Series
 Prince Charming (2018) (first published as Royals)
 Her Royal Highness (2019)

Short stories
 "Eyes in the Dark", Defy the Dark, ed. Saundra Mitchell (2013)
 "The Key", Grim, ed. Christine Johnson (2014)

Middle grade fiction
 Journey's End (2016)
 Ruby & Olivia (2017)

Adult fiction
 The Wife Upstairs (2021)
 The Ex Hex (2021) (writing as Erin Sterling)
 The Kiss Curse (2022) (writing as Erin Sterling)
 Reckless Girls (2022)
 The Villa (2023)

Audiobooks
 Beatrix Greene, Serial Box (2020) (writing with Ash Parsons and Vicky Alvear Shecter; first published as The Haunting of Beatrix Greene)

References

1979 births
American women writers
Living people
Writers from Alabama
Auburn University alumni
21st-century American women writers